Turboraketti is a space dog fight game for Amiga computers created by Finnish game designer Heikki Kosola. 

There's plenty of misleading information about the publishing year of the game and the sequel. According to Kosola he created the beta version of Turboraketti in 1992 and the final version in 1993. Some people have thought that the final version is the sequel but Kosola says that there has never been Turboraketti II.

Turboraketti is played by two people fighting each other with spaceships. The game is similar to an earlier game called Gravity Force. The ships are viewed from a side perspective and gravity pulls ships down. The screen is split in two halves in vertical direction. Both players have one half of the screen. Hitting a landscape or another ship destroys the vessel. Movement of ships is affected by their thrust, gravity and drag in air and liquid. 

The players can choose from various weapons that are advantageous in different situations. Rapid fire weapons are good for causing at least some damage for the opponent and non-rapid fire weapons are good for hitting the opponent hard from proximity. The players can load weapons and fuel on their base platforms. The base platform can also repair a ship. The player needs to make a trade-off between good acceleration (small mass) and the amount of ordnance and fuel loaded. It is also possible to play the game as a time race.

External links
 Turboraketti fan web site

 All Turboraketti level maps.

References

 This article was submitted to the Amiga Games Database, and the author gave public domain status for this review. See the database entry.

1992 video games
Amiga games
Amiga-only games
Multidirectional shooters
Video games developed in Finland